HMS Strenuous was an  destroyer, which served with the Royal Navy. Launched 9 November 1918 two days before the Armistice, the ship was too late to see service in the First World War. Instead, the destroyer served for only a few months as part of the Atlantic Fleet before being transferred to Reserve in May 1920, where the ship remained for the next ten years. The London Naval Treaty, signed in 1930, required the retirement of some destroyers to meet the Royal Navy's tonnage requirement and Strenuous was chosen as one of those to leave the service. The destroyer was therefore decommissioned and sold to be broken up on 25 August 1932.

Design and development

Strenuous was one of thirty-three Admiralty  destroyers ordered by the British Admiralty in June 1917 as part of the Twelfth War Construction Programme. Differences with the R class were minor, such as having the searchlight moved aft. The vessel was the second of the name in the Royal Navy.

Two funnels were fitted.

Armament consisted of three QF  Mk IV guns on the ship's centreline.  One was mounted raised on the forecastle, one between the funnels and one aft. The ship also mounted a single 2-pounder (40 mm) pom-pom anti-aircraft gun for air defence. Four  torpedo tubes were fitted in two twin rotating mounts aft. The ship was designed to mount two  tubes either side of the superstructure but this addition required the forecastle plating to be cut away, making the vessel very wet, so they were removed. The weight saved enabled the heavier Mark V 21-inch torpedo to be carried. The ship's complement was 90 officers and ratings.

Construction and career
Laid down in January 1918 by Scotts in Greenock with the yard number 493, Strenuous was launched on 9 November 1918. The Armistice two days later meant that the destroyer never saw active wartime service. Completed on 20 October 1919, the ship joined the Fourth Destroyer Flotilla of the Atlantic Fleet under the  light cruiser . The destroyer was allocated the pennant number G64. The ship served in active duty for only a few months, being recommissioned to Reserve Fleet at Devonport on 6 May 1920.

On 22 April 1930, the United Kingdom signed the London Naval Treaty, which limited total destroyer tonnage in the Navy. Having remained on reserve for more than a decade, Strenuous was in poor condition and was one of those chosen to be retired. On 25 August 1932, the destroyer was sold to Metal Industries of Charlestown, Fife, and broken up at Grays.

References

Citations

Bibliography

 
 
 
 
 

 

1918 ships
Ships built on the River Clyde
S-class destroyers (1917) of the Royal Navy